Estadio Marcelo A. Bielsa is a stadium located within Parque de la Independencia in the city of Rosario, Argentina. Inaugurated in 1911, it is the home ground of club Newell's Old Boys. The venue didn't have any official name until December 22, 2009, when it was named after the former coach of the club Marcelo Bielsa. Until then it was simply called El Coloso del Parque ("The Colossus of the Park"), and this remained as the stadium's popular name. Although the stadium is currently used mostly for football matches, it has hosted some rugby union games sometimes, albeit rarely.

Since its opening in 1911, the stadium has been refurbished and expanded several times since. It currently holds 42,000 people.

History

Previous fields 
The first pitch or "field" as it was called at that time was located between the streets Boulevard Humberto First and Avellaneda, in the northwest of the city of Rosario, in the neighborhood of the workshops. The same was achieved through management by Claudio Newell (son of Isaac Newell, founder of the club), and was opened in 1905. It was the scene of the beginning of the meetings at that time the Football League Rosarina. The same had few amenities: had only a small box lumber modest. Due to this and the growth of the club, he found a new space for the field.

In 1907, thanks to the efforts of the then Mayor of Rosario, Nicasio Vila, who ceded some land, the field moved to the block between Avenue United Provinces streets, San Luis and La Rioja, in the neighborhood Vila, in the west corner of the city.

Parque de la Independencia 
On July 23rd, 1911, Newell's Old Boys opened their new stadium in the Parque de la Independencia in the heart of Rosario. The stadium's design was in line with English stadiums of the time. 

The original stadium was a wooden stand, and has in the years since had multiple additions to bring it to its current form. 
On July 9th, 1918, the stadium debuted its first expansion, an iron and wooden stand for 3,000 spectators, bringing total capacity to 10,000. In 1925, the club built the north end stands. On May 26th, 1929 the stadium's western stand opened, which was the first made of cement, and covered with a roof.   

By 1930, Newell's had a stadium that could seat 30,000 spectators. Between 1971 and 1973, the stadium was completed with cement stands, and various other improvements and expansions.

In the 1990s, the club completed two new stands that elevated the stadium's capacity to 40,000, which took the nickname of "El Coloso del Parque" (The Colossus of the Park). The south stand was later named after superstar Diego Maradona, who had a brief tenure on Newell's as player in September 1993.

Since December 2008, the stadium has undergone continuous changes. At the end of 2009, the club decided to name the stadium after Marcelo Bielsa, and the Western concourse after Gerardo Martino, both former players and managers that had been relegated from the club during the presidency of Eduardo José López (1994–2008).

Coinciding with his 40th birthday, a stand was named after club captain Maxi Rodríguez in January 2021.

Events

2001 FIFA U20 World Cup 
The first international football tournament at Marcelo Bielsa Stadium was in 2001 when the stadium was chosen as one of the venues for the FIFA U-20 World Cup held in Argentina. The stadium hosted all matches of Group D plus the round of 16 and quarter finals (one game each).

Rugby U20 World Cup 
On the other side, the stadium also hosted rugby union games when in 2010 it was one of the three venues of the World Rugby U-20 Championship. All the pool C matches, the semifinals and final were played at Newell's Old Boys Stadium.

Other events 
Estadio Marcelo Bielsa also hosted political party acts, when in 2005 then president of Argentina, Néstor Kirchner, gave a speech as part of the Front for Victory campaign for the legislative election in the country.

References

External links

 

s
m
1911 establishments in Argentina